Krohn is the surname of several people:
 Aino Krohn, a Finnish author better known as Aino Kallas
 August David Krohn, a Russian zoologist
 Chester A. Krohn, American politician
 , a German Federal Court Justice

 Felix Krohn, Finnish composer, son of Ilmari

 Helmi Krohn, a Finnish editor and writer
 Henrik Krohn (1826–1879) Norwegian poet, magazine editor and proponent for Nynorsk language
 , Finnish composer and musicologist, son of Julius
 Irina Krohn, a Finnish member of Parliament
 Jasmin Krohn (b. 1966), Swedish speed skater
 Jonathan Krohn, American journalist and writer
 Julius Krohn, nephew of August, fennoman and folklorist 
 Kaarle Krohn, Finnish folklorist, son of Julius
 Katherine Elizabeth Krohn, German-born American author
 Kenneth Krohn, co-developer of the Krohn–Rhodes theory
 Kristin Krohn Devold, a Norwegian politician
Kris Krohn, a financial advisor
 Lars Monrad-Krohn, a Norwegian engineer
 Leena Krohn, a Finnish author
 Michael Krohn
 Michael Krohn-Dehli (b. 1983), Danish footballer 
, a Norwegian musician
 Paysach Krohn, rabbi 
 Ramble John Krohn, an American hip hop producer also known as RJD2
 Rebecca Krohn, American ballet dancer
 Stuart Krohn (born 1962), American professional rugby union player
 Tim Krohn, recipient of the 1994 Conrad-Ferdinand-Meyer-Preis
 Tracy Krohn, owner of Krohn Racing/TRG
 Juan María Fernández y Krohn, Catholic priest, would-be assassin

See also 
 Krohn Conservatory, Cincinnati, Ohio, US
 Crohn's disease
 Kron (disambiguation)